Luu Xa station is a railway station in Vietnam. It serves the area southern of Thái Nguyên city, in Thái Nguyên Province.

Buildings and structures in Thái Nguyên province
Railway stations in Vietnam